{{DISPLAYTITLE:Dopamine receptor D3}}

Dopamine receptor D3 is a protein that in humans is encoded by the DRD3 gene.

This gene encodes the D3 subtype of the dopamine receptor. The D3 subtype inhibits adenylyl cyclase through inhibitory G-proteins. This receptor is expressed in phylogenetically older regions of the brain, suggesting that this receptor plays a role in cognitive and emotional functions. It is a target for drugs which treat schizophrenia, drug addiction, and Parkinson's disease. Alternative splicing of this gene results in multiple transcript variants that would encode different isoforms, although some variants may be subject to nonsense-mediated decay (NMD).

Function 

Alpha-synuclein (α-Syn) aggregation via Lewy bodies inclusion, a pathogenic signature exclusively present in PD patients, is decreased by D3 agonists while DA content is elevated by inhibiting DA reuptake and breakdown. The regulation of α-Syn aggregation and clearance enhances brain-derived neurotrophic factor (BDNF) secretion, which ultimately ameliorates neuroinflammation and oxidative stress while promoting neurogenesis and interacting with other DA receptors.

D3 agonists like 7-OH-DPAT, pramipexole, and rotigotine, among others, display antidepressant effects in rodent models of depression. Apomorphine has the ability to help PD patients with their cognition awareness. In addition to having antidepressant properties such as regulating the depression-like behaviors and depression development, pramipexole has the capability to prevent and slow down cell apoptosis as well as to restore damaged neural networks and connections while rotigotine help PD patients to attenuates hyperpyrexia syndrome and schizophrenia.

Animal studies 

D3 agonists have been shown to disrupt prepulse inhibition of startle (PPI), a cross-species measure that recapitulates deficits in sensorimotor gating in neuropsychiatric disorders such as schizophrenia. In contrast,  D3-preferring antagonists have antipsychotic-like profiles in measures of PPI in rats.

Ligands

Agonists

 trans-N-{4-[4-(2,3-Dichlorophenyl)-1-piperazinyl]cyclohexyl}-3-methoxybenzamide, full agonist, > 200-fold binding selectivity over D4, D2, 5-HT1A, and α1-receptors
 (-)-7-{[2-(4-Phenylpiperazin-1-yl)ethyl]propylamino}-5,6,7,8-tetrahydronaphthalen-2-ol
 5-OH-DPAT
 7-OH-DPAT
 Pergolide
 8-OH-PBZI (cis-8-Hydroxy-3-(n-propyl)-1,2,3a,4,5,9b-hexahydro-1H-benz[e]indole)
 Apomorphine (non-selective dopamine agonist)
 Bromocriptine (non-selective dopamine agonist)
 Captodiame
 CJ-1639
 compound R,R-16: 250x binding selectivity over D2
 Dopamine (endogenous agonist)
 ES609
 FAUC 54
 FAUC 73
 PD-128,907
 PF-219,061 (extremely selective) 
 PF-592,379
 Piribedil (non-selective dopamine agonist)
 Pramipexole (non-selective dopamine agonist)
 Quinelorane (also D2 agonist)
 Quinpirole (also D2 agonist)
 Ropinirole (non-selective dopamine agonist)
 Rotigotine (non-selective dopamine agonist)

Partial agonists

 Aripiprazole (non-selective)
 BP-897
 Brexpiprazole (non-selective)
 Buspirone (non-selective)
 Cariprazine
 CJB 090
 CJ-1037 (extremely selective) 
 FAUC 460 (highly selective) 
 FAUC 346 (highly selective)
 Pardoprunox (non-selective)
 Roxindole (possibly a partial agonist at the D3 autoreceptors, non-selective)
 OS-3-106
 UH-232
 WW-III-55

Antagonists

 Most Antipsychotics
 Amisulpride (non-selective)
 Cyproheptadine (non-selective)
 PG 01037  
 Domperidone (peripheral D2 and D3 antagonist)
 FAUC 365, silent antagonist, subtype selective
 GR-103,691
 GSK598809 (highly selective)
 Haloperidol (non-selective, blocks all dopamine receptor subtypes, though D3 with the strongest affinity)
 N-(4-(4-(2,3-Dichloro- or 2-methoxyphenyl)piperazin-1-yl)butyl)heterobiarylcarboxamides
 Nafadotride
 NGB-2904
 PNU-99,194 (moderately selective over D2)
 Raclopride (also D2 antagonist) 
 S-14,297 (selective)
 S33084
 SB-277011-A, selective D3 antagonist, 80x selectivity over D2 with no partial agonist effects, used in drug addiction research as a potential therapy for addiction to several different drugs
 SR 21502 (highly selective)
 Sulpiride (also D2 antagonist)
 U99194
 YQA14 (high affinity and selectivity)
 Risperidone

Interactions 

Dopamine receptor D3 has been shown to interact with CLIC6 and EPB41L1.

DRD3 Ser9Gly polymorphism(rs6280), which is a single nucleotide polymorphism (SNP) with variant base C/T is linked to variation in PD such as depression severity, impulse control disorders, behavioral addiction and aberrant decision-making.

See also 
 Dopamine receptor

References

Further reading

External links 
 
 

Dopamine receptors
Biology of attention deficit hyperactivity disorder